Phillis Wheatley Peters, also spelled Phyllis and Wheatly ( – December 5, 1784) was an American author who is considered the first African-American author of a published book of poetry. Born in West Africa, she was kidnapped and subsequently sold into enslavement at the age of seven or eight and transported to North America, where she was bought by the Wheatley family of Boston. After she learned to read and write, they encouraged her poetry when they saw her talent.

On a 1773 trip to London with her enslaver's son, seeking publication of her work, Wheatley met prominent people who became patrons. The publication in London of her Poems on Various Subjects, Religious and Moral on September 1, 1773, brought her fame both in England and the American colonies. Figures such as George Washington praised her work. A few years later, African-American poet Jupiter Hammon praised her work in a poem of his own.

Wheatley was emancipated by her enslavers shortly after the publication of her book. They soon died, and she married John Peters, a poor grocer. They lost three children, who died young. Wheatley-Peters died in poverty and obscurity at the age of 31.

Early life

Although the date and place of her birth are not documented, scholars believe that Phillis Wheatley was born in 1753 in West Africa, most likely in present-day Gambia or Senegal. She was sold by a local chief to a visiting trader, who took her to Boston in the British Colony of Massachusetts, on July 11, 1761, on a slave ship called The Phillis. It was owned by Timothy Fitch and captained by Peter Gwinn.

On arrival in Boston, she was bought by the wealthy Boston merchant and tailor John Wheatley as a slave for his wife Susanna. John and Susanna Wheatley named her Phillis, after the ship that had transported her to America. She was given their last name of Wheatley, as was a common custom if any surname was used for enslaved people.

The Wheatleys' 18-year-old daughter, Mary, was Phillis's first tutor in reading and writing. Their son, Nathaniel, also helped her. John Wheatley was known as a progressive throughout New England; his family afforded Phillis an unprecedented education for an enslaved person, and one unusual for a woman of any race. By the age of 12, she was reading Greek and Latin classics in their original languages, as well as difficult passages from the Bible. At the age of 14, she wrote her first poem, "To the University of Cambridge [Harvard], in New England". Recognizing her literary ability, the Wheatley family supported Phillis's education and left household labor to their other domestic enslaved workers. The Wheatleys often showed off her abilities to friends and family. Strongly influenced by her readings of the works of Alexander Pope, John Milton, Homer, Horace, and Virgil, Phillis began to write poetry.

Later life
In 1773, at the age of 20, Phillis accompanied Nathaniel Wheatley to London in part for her health (she suffered from chronic asthma), but largely because Susanna believed Phillis would have a better chance of publishing her book of poems there. She had an audience with Frederick Bull, who was the Lord Mayor of London, and other significant members of British society. (An audience with King George III was arranged, but Phillis returned to Boston before it could take place.) Selina Hastings, Countess of Huntingdon, became interested in the talented young African woman and subsidized the publication of Wheatley's volume of poems, which appeared in London in the summer of 1773. As Hastings was ill, she and Phillis never met.

After her book was published, by November 1773, the Wheatleys emancipated Phillis. Her former enslaver Susanna died in the spring of 1774, and John in 1778. Shortly after, Wheatley met and married John Peters, a free black grocer. They lived in poor conditions and two of their babies died.

John was improvident and was imprisoned for debt in 1784. With a sickly infant son to provide for, Phillis became a scullery maid at a boarding house, work she had not done before. She died on December 5, 1784, at the age of 31. Her infant son died soon after.

Other writings
Phillis Wheatley wrote a letter to Reverend Samson Occom, commending him on his ideas and beliefs stating that enslaved people should be given their natural-born rights in America. Wheatley also exchanged letters with the British philanthropist John Thornton, who discussed Wheatley and her poetry in correspondence with John Newton. Along with her poetry, she was able to express her thoughts, comments and concerns to others.

In 1775, she sent a copy of a poem entitled "To His Excellency, George Washington" to the then-military general. The following year, Washington invited Wheatley to visit him at his headquarters in Cambridge, Massachusetts, which she did in March 1776. Thomas Paine republished the poem in the Pennsylvania Gazette in April 1776.

In 1779 Wheatley issued a proposal for a second volume of poems but was unable to publish it because she had lost her patrons after her emancipation; publication of books was often based on gaining subscriptions for guaranteed sales beforehand. The American Revolutionary War (1775–1783) was also a factor. However, some of her poems that were to be included in the second volume were later published in pamphlets and newspapers.

Poetry

In 1768, Wheatley wrote "To the King's Most Excellent Majesty", in which she praised King George III for repealing the Stamp Act. As the American Revolution gained strength, Wheatley's writing turned to themes that expressed ideas of the rebellious colonists.

In 1770 Wheatley wrote a poetic tribute to the evangelist George Whitefield. Her poetry expressed Christian themes, and many poems were dedicated to famous figures. Over one-third consist of elegies, the remainder being on religious, classical, and abstract themes. She seldom referred to her own life in her poems. One example of a poem on slavery is "On being brought from Africa to America":

Many colonists found it difficult to believe that an African slave was writing "excellent" poetry. Wheatley had to defend her authorship of her poetry in court in 1772. She was examined by a group of Boston luminaries, including John Erving, Reverend Charles Chauncey, John Hancock, Thomas Hutchinson, the governor of Massachusetts, and his lieutenant governor Andrew Oliver. They concluded she had written the poems ascribed to her and signed an attestation, which was included in the preface of her book of collected works: Poems on Various Subjects, Religious and Moral, published in London in 1773. Publishers in Boston had declined to publish it, but her work was of great interest to influential people in London.

There, Selina, Countess of Huntingdon, and the Earl of Dartmouth acted as patrons to help Wheatley gain publication. Her poetry received comment in The London Magazine in 1773, which published her poem "Hymn to the Morning" as a specimen of her work, writing: "[t]hese poems display no astonishing power of genius; but when we consider them as the productions of a young untutored African, who wrote them after six months casual study of the English language and of writing, we cannot suppress our admiration of talents so vigorous and lively." Poems on Various Subjects, Religious and Moral was printed in 11 editions until 1816.

In 1778, the African-American poet Jupiter Hammon wrote an ode to Wheatley ("An Address to Miss Phillis Wheatley"). His master Lloyd had temporarily moved with his slaves to Hartford, Connecticut, during the Revolutionary War. Hammon thought that Wheatley had succumbed to what he believed were pagan influences in her writing, and so his "Address" consisted of 21 rhyming quatrains, each accompanied by a related Bible verse, that he thought would compel Wheatley to return to a Christian path in life.

In 1838 Boston-based publisher and abolitionist Isaac Knapp published a collection of Wheatley's poetry, along with that of enslaved North Carolina poet George Moses Horton, under the title Memoir and Poems of Phillis Wheatley, A Native African and a Slave. Also, Poems by a Slave. Wheatley's memoir was earlier published in 1834 by Geo W. Light but did not include poems by Horton.

Thomas Jefferson, in his book Notes on the State of Virginia, was unwilling to acknowledge the value of her work or the work of any black poet. He wrote:Misery is often the parent of the most affecting touches in poetry. Among the blacks is misery enough, God knows, but no poetry. Love is the peculiar oestrum of the poet. Their love is ardent, but it kindles the senses only, not the imagination. Religion indeed has produced a Phyllis Whately  but it could not produce a poet. The compositions published under her name are below the dignity of criticism.

Style, structure, and influences on poetry
Wheatley believed that the power of poetry was immeasurable. John C. Shields, noting that her poetry did not simply reflect the literature she read but was based on her personal ideas and beliefs, writes:
"Wheatley had more in mind than simple conformity. It will be shown later that her allusions to the sun god and to the goddess of the morn, always appearing as they do here in close association with her quest for poetic inspiration, are of central importance to her."This poem is arranged into three stanzas of four lines in iambic tetrameter, followed by a concluding couplet in iambic pentameter. The rhyme scheme is ABABCC. Shields sums up her writing as being "contemplative and reflective rather than brilliant and shimmering."

She repeated three primary elements: Christianity, classicism, and hierophantic solar worship. The hierophantic solar worship was part of what she brought with her from Africa; the worship of sun gods is expressed as part of her African culture, which may be why she used so many different words for the sun.  For instance, she uses Aurora eight times, "Apollo seven, Phoebus twelve, and Sol twice." Shields believes that the word "light" is significant to her as it marks her African history, a past that she has left physically behind. He notes that Sun is a homonym for Son, and that Wheatley intended a double reference to Christ. Wheatley also refers to "heav'nly muse" in two of her poems: "To a Clergy Man on the Death of his Lady" and "Isaiah LXIII," signifying her idea of the Christian deity.

Classical allusions are prominent in Wheatley's poetry, which Shields argues set her work apart from that of her contemporaries: "Wheatley's use of classicism distinguishes her work as original and unique and deserves extended treatment." Particularly extended engagement with the Classics can be found in the poem "To Maecenas", where Wheatley uses references to Maecenas to depict the relationship between her and her own patrons, as well as making reference to Achilles and Patroclus, Homer and Virgil. At the same time, Wheatley indicates to the complexity of her relationship with Classical texts by pointing to the sole example of Terence as an ancestor for her works: 

While some scholars have argued that Wheatley's allusions to classical material are based on the reading of other neoclassical poetry (such as the works of Alexander Pope), Emily Greenwood has demonstrated that Wheatley's work demonstrates persistent linguistic engagement with Latin texts, suggesting good familiarity with the ancient works themselves. Both Shields and Greenwood have argued that Wheatley's use of classical imagery and ideas was designed to deliver "subversive" messages to her educated, majority white audience, and argue for the freedom of Wheatley herself and other enslaved people.

Scholarly critique 
Black literary scholars from the 1960s to the present in critiquing Wheatley's writing have noted the absence in it of her sense of identity as a black enslaved person. A number of black literary scholars have viewed her work—and its widespread admiration—as a barrier to the development of black people during her time and as a prime example of Uncle Tom syndrome, believing that Wheatley's lack of awareness of her condition of enslavement furthers this syndrome among descendants of Africans in the Americas.

Some scholars thought Wheatley's perspective came from her upbringing. Writing in 1974, Eleanor Smith argued that the Wheatley family took interest in her at a young age because of her timid and submissive nature. Using this to their advantage, the Wheatley family was able to mold and shape her into a person of their liking. The family separated her from other slaves in the home and she was prevented from doing anything other than very light housework.  This shaping prevented Phillis from ever becoming a threat to the Wheatley family or other people from the white community.  As a result, Phillis was allowed to attend white social events and this created a misconception of the relationship between black and white people for her.

The matter of Wheatley's biography, "a white woman's memoir", has been a subject of investigation. In 2020, American poet Honorée Fanonne Jeffers published her The Age of Phillis, based on the understanding that Margaretta Matilda Odell's account of Wheatley's life portrayed Wheatley inaccurately, and as a character in a sentimental novel; the poems by Jeffers attempt to fill in the gaps and recreate a more realistic portrait of Wheatley.

Legacy and honors
With the 1773 publication of Wheatley's book Poems on Various Subjects, she "became the most famous African on the face of the earth." Voltaire stated in a letter to a friend that Wheatley had proved that black people could write poetry. John Paul Jones asked a fellow officer to deliver some of his personal writings to "Phillis the African favorite of the Nine (muses) and Apollo." She was honored by many of America's founding fathers, including George Washington, who wrote to her (after she wrote a poem in his honor) that "the style and manner [of your poetry] exhibit a striking proof of your great poetical Talents."

Critics consider her work fundamental to the genre of African-American literature, and she is honored as the first African-American woman to publish a book of poetry and the first to make a living from her writing.

In 2002, the scholar Molefi Kete Asante listed Phillis Wheatley as one of his 100 Greatest African Americans.
Wheatley is featured, along with Abigail Adams and Lucy Stone, in the Boston Women's Memorial, a 2003 sculpture on Commonwealth Avenue in Boston, Massachusetts.
In 2012, Robert Morris University named the new building for their School of Communications and Information Sciences after Phillis Wheatley.
Wheatley Hall at UMass Boston is named for Phillis Wheatley.

In 1892 a Phyllis Wheatley Circle was formed in Greenville, Mississippi. and in 1896 the Phyllis Wheatley Circle.

She is commemorated on the Boston Women's Heritage Trail.  The Phyllis Wheatley YWCA in Washington, D.C., and the Phillis Wheatley High School in Houston, Texas, are named for her, as was the historic Phillis Wheatley School in Jensen Beach, Florida, now the oldest building on the campus of American Legion Post 126 (Jensen Beach, Florida).  A branch of the Richland County Library in Columbia, South Carolina, which offered the first library services to black citizens, is named for her. Phillis Wheatley Elementary School, New Orleans, opened in 1954 in Tremé, one of the oldest African-American neighborhoods in the US. The Phillis Wheatley Community Center opened in 1920 in Greenville, South Carolina, and in 1924 (spelled "Phyllis") in Minneapolis, Minnesota.

On July 16, 2019, at the London site where A. Bell Booksellers published Wheatley's first book in September 1773 (8 Aldgate, now the location of the Dorsett City Hotel), the unveiling took place of a commemorative blue plaque honoring her, organized by the Nubian Jak Community Trust and Black History Walks.

Wheatley is the subject of a project and play by British-Nigerian writer Ade Solanke entitled Phillis in London, which was showcased at the Greenwich Book Festival in June 2018.

See also
 African-American literature
 AALBC.com
 Elijah McCoy
 List of 18th-century British working-class writers
 Phillis Wheatley Club
 Slave narrative

References

Further reading
 Primary materials
 Wheatley, Phillis (1988). John C. Shields, ed. The Collected Works of Phillis Wheatley. New York: Oxford University Press. 
 Wheatley, Phillis (2001). Vincent Carretta, ed. Complete Writings. New York: Penguin Books. 
 Biographies
 Borland, Kathryn Kilby and Speicher, Helen Ross (1968). Phillis Wheatley: Young Colonial Poet. Indianapolis: Bobbs-Merrill.
 Carretta, Vincent (2011). Phillis Wheatley: Biography of A Genius in Bondage. Athens: University of Georgia Press. 
 Gates, Henry Louis Jr. (2003). The Trials of Phillis Wheatley: America's First Black Poet and Her Encounters with the Founding Fathers, New York: Basic Civitas Books. 
 Richmond, M. A. (1988). Phillis Wheatley. New York: Chelsea House Publishers. 
 Waldstreicher, David (2023). The Odyssey of Phillis Wheatley: A Poet's Journeys Through American Slavery and Independence. New York: Farrar, Straus and Giroux. . Review 

 Secondary materials
 Abcarian, Richard and Marvin Klotz. "Phillis Wheatley," In Literature: The Human Experience, 9th edition. New York: Bedford/St. Martin's, 2006: p. 1606. 
 Barker-Benfield, Graham J. Phillis Wheatley Chooses Freedom: History, Poetry, and the Ideals of the American Revolution (NYU Press, 2018).
 Bassard, Katherine Clay (1999). Spiritual Interrogations: Culture, Gender, and Community in Early African American Women's Writing. Princeton: Princeton University Press. 
 
 Chowdhury, Rowshan Jahan. "Restriction, Resistance, and Humility: A Feminist Approach to Anne Bradstreet and Phillis Wheatley’s Literary Works." Crossings 10 (2019) 47–56 online
 Engberg, Kathrynn Seidler, The Right to Write: The Literary Politics of Anne Bradstreet and Phillis Wheatley. Washington, D.C.: University Press of America, 2009. 
 Langley, April C. E. (2008). The Black Aesthetic Unbound: Theorizing the Dilemma of Eighteenth-century African American Literature. Columbus: Ohio State University Press. 
 Ogude, S. E. (1983). Genius in Bondage: A Study of the Origins of African Literature in English. Ile-Ife, Nigeria: University of Ife Press. 
 Reising, Russel J. (1996). Loose Ends: Closure and Crisis in the American Social Text. Durham: Duke University Press. 
 Robinson, William Henry (1981). Phillis Wheatley: A Bio-bibliography. Boston: GK Hall. 
 Robinson, William Henry (1982). Critical Essays on Phillis Wheatley. Boston: GK Hall. 
 Robinson, William Henry (1984). Phillis Wheatley and Her Writings. New York: Garland. 
 Shockley, Ann Allen (1988). Afro-American Women Writers, 1746–1933: An Anthology and Critical Guide. Boston: GK Hall. 
 Waldstreicher, David. "The Wheatleyan Moment." Early American Studies (2011): 522–551. online
 Waldstreicher, David. "Ancients, Moderns, and Africans: Phillis Wheatley and the Politics of Empire and Slavery in the American Revolution." Journal of the Early Republic 37.4 (2017): 701–733. online
 Zuck, Rochelle Raineri. "Poetic Economics: Phillis Wheatley and the Production of the Black Artist in the Early Atlantic World." Ethnic Studies Review 33.2 (2010): 143–168 online.

 Poetry (inspired by Wheatley)
 Clarke, Alison (2020). Phillis. University of Calgary Press. 
 Jeffers, Honorée Fanonne (2020). The Age of Phillis. Wesleyan University Press.

External links

 
 
 
 
 
 "Phillis Wheatley" National Women's History Museum
Stuart A. Rose Manuscript, Archives, and Rare Book Library, Emory University: Phillis Wheatley collection, 1757–1773

 
1753 births
1784 deaths
Deaths in childbirth
American women poets
American people of Senegalese descent
American people of Gambian descent
American Congregationalists
Cultural history of Boston
Writers from Boston
People of colonial Massachusetts
People of Massachusetts in the American Revolution
African-American women writers
African-American poets
Colonial American poets
18th-century American poets
People from colonial Boston
African-American Christians
18th-century American women writers
Free Negroes
Black Patriots
18th-century African-American women
Literate American slaves
Colonial American expatriates in Great Britain